Lee Hsing-wen (born 19 July 1967) is a Taiwanese actor. He is best known for portraying military men in films and TV dramas. Lee's son Max is a YouTuber.

Filmography

Films

TV dramas (incomplete)

Awards and nominations

References

External links

1967 births
Living people
20th-century Taiwanese male actors
21st-century Taiwanese male actors
Taiwanese male film actors
Taiwanese male television actors
Taiwanese people from Anhui
People from Changhua County